Open Door is a small town in Luján Partido, Buenos Aires Province, Argentina.

History
The settlement was founded in the early 20th century, and like many other settlements in Argentina the original nucleus of the settlement was a railway station. The settlement was originally called "Colonia Nacional Psiquiátrica Domingo Cabred", but the name was changed to Open Door, based upon Doctor Domingo Cabred's "open door" policy with regard to the treatment of the mentally ill.

External links

Populated places in Buenos Aires Province